Krazy Maze was a board game.  In Australia it was manufactured under licence by G. N. Raymond Pty Ltd.

Gameplay
Two separate paths wind through a densely illustrated picturesque landscape.  When two players play each takes a separate path.  The game came with a spinner, called a "spino", which displayed numbers from 1 to 8.  Players take turns spinning and moving their counter the corresponding number of squares.  Some squares on each track are marked with a letter of the alphabet.  If a counter ends its move on one of these squares a table of instructions, printed on the inside of the lid, is consulted. For example, landing on the "A" square of the left track results in the instruction "Forgotten lunch. Back to start"; landing on the B square results in "Tiger snake on road. Extra spin to get past."  The two tracks diverge at square one and rejoin at square 89. Square 90 is the last square.  A player must spin the exact number to land on square 90; the first player to do this wins.

External Links
 Board Game Geek entry for Krazy Maze

Party board games